Thompson v. Trump is an ongoing federal case brought by Bennie Thompson against Donald Trump on February 16, 2021. The lawsuit claims that Trump and others conspired to incite the violent Capitol insurrection on January 6, 2021.

Background
On February 16, 2021, The New York Times reported that the NAACP had filed a lawsuit against former President Donald J. Trump, Rudolph Giuliani, the Proud Boys and the Oath Keepers. The lawsuit is centered around the 1871 KKK Act, designed to protect members of Congress from violent conspiracies that interfere with their official Congressional duties.

In an interview with The Guardian, NAACP President Derrick Johnson stated that the "former administration and Giuliani sought to disqualify our votes" and accused Trump of "operating under a white supremacist doctrine that was a derived  from days of the Confederacy".

The Ku Klux Klan Act of 1871
On the lawsuit, Axios reported that "The 1871 Ku Klux Klan Act allowed President Ulysses S. Grant to declare martial law, impose heavy penalties against terrorist organizations, and use military force to suppress the Ku Klux Klan after the Civil War".

References

Aftermath of the January 6 United States Capitol attack
United States lawsuits
NAACP
Proud Boys
Donald Trump litigation
2021 in United States case law
United States District Court for the District of Columbia cases